North Mugirango is one of four constituencies in Nyamira County. In 1966 the North Mugirango Constituency was split into West Mugirango and a smaller North Mugirango.  The name was changed to Borabu / North Mugirango Constituency in 1974. In 1987 the name changed back to North Mugirango. Prior to 2013, it was formally known as North Mugirango (Borabu) Constituency.

Members of Parliament

Wards 
Prior to 2013, North Mugirango Borabu Constituency had thirteen wards: Bomwagamo, Central, Ekerenyo, Ensakia, Esise, Kiangeni, Kiabonyoru, Mageri, Magwagwa, Manga, Matutu, Mekenene and Nyaramba. However, ward boundaries and some of the names were revised to: Bomwagamo, Bokeira, Ekerenyo, Itibo and Magwagwa.

Nyamira North Sub-county
Nyamira North Sub-county shares common boundaries with North Mugirango Constituency. The Sub-county is headed by the sub-county administrator, appointed by a County Public Service Board.

References

External links 

Constituencies in Nyanza Province
Constituencies in Nyamira County